Venerupis is a genus of marine bivalve molluscs in the subfamily Petricolinae  of the family Veneridae commonly known as carpet shells.

Species
 Lajonkairia cancellata (Gmelin, 1791)
 Lajonkairia digitalis (E. A. Smith, 1916)
 Lajonkairia divaricata (Lischke, 1872)
 Lajonkairia elegans (H. Adams, 1870)
 Lajonkairia lajonkairii (Payraudeau, 1826)
 Lajonkairia substriata (Montagu, 1808)
Synonyms
 Lajonkairia digitale [sic]: synonym of Lajonkairia digitalis (E. A. Smith, 1916) (incorrect gender ending)

References

External links
 Deshayes, G. P. (1853-1855). Catalogue of the Conchifera or bivalve shells in the collection of the British Museum. British Museum, London, Part I. Cyprinidae, Veneridae and Glauconomidae, pp. ii + 216 pp
 Jukes-Browne A.J. 1910. On Petricola, Lucinopsis, and the family Petricolidae. Proceedings of the Malacological Society of London, 9: 214-224.
  Gofas, S.; Le Renard, J.; Bouchet, P. (2001). Mollusca. in: Costello, M.J. et al. (eds), European Register of Marine Species: a check-list of the marine species in Europe and a bibliography of guides to their identification. Patrimoines Naturels. 50: 180-213
 Fischer, P. (1880-1887). Manuel de conchyliologie et de paléontologie conchyliologique, ou histoire naturelle des mollusques vivants et fossiles suivi d'un Appendice sur les Brachiopodes par D. P. Oehlert. Avec 23 planches contenant 600 figures dessinées par S. P. Woodward.. Paris: F. Savy. Published in 11 parts (fascicules), xxiv + 1369 pp., 23 pls

Veneridae
Bivalve genera